Kill Your Pet Puppy was a UK punk zine that ran for six issues between 1979 and 1984. It was edited by Tony Drayton (Tony D)  who had previously produced Ripped and Torn fanzine, which he started in October 1976 and for 18 issues until 1979.

KYPP pushed the boundaries of punk through a period which saw the birth of anarcho-punk and the beginnings of the goth subculture. The final issue, No. 6, described a journey from a punk squat in London to Stonehenge Free Festival. Groups featured  in KYPP were Adam and the Ants, Crass, Bauhaus, Southern Death Cult, The Mob, The Associates, Charge, Sex Gang Children and the Cuddly Toys.

KYPP was written and designed in 'anarcho-situationist style' by a fluctuating group of around 12 members of the Puppy Collective.  Influences on KYPP ranged from sixties undergrounds magazines like OZ and International Times, to Wilhelm Reich, the Angry Brigade, Aleister Crowley, surrealism, eco-feminism and David Bowie. 

The Puppy Collective were also variously active participants in events and situations of the period - including a Sid Vicious Memorial March in 1979, the Wapping Autonomy Centre in 1981/2, Centro Iberico Anarchist Centre 1982,  the 1982 Stonehenge to Greenham Peace Convoy and the 1983 Stop the City protest and the 1982/3/4 Stonehenge Free festivals.

References

External links
 KYPP online
 Alistair Livingston's Blog (KYPP Collective Member)

1979 establishments in the United Kingdom
1984 disestablishments in the United Kingdom
Music magazines published in the United Kingdom
Defunct magazines published in the United Kingdom
Magazines established in 1979
Magazines disestablished in 1984
Punk zines